Tornelasmias is a genus of minute air-breathing land snails, terrestrial pulmonate gastropod mollusks or micromollusks in the family Achatinellidae.

Species
Species within the genus Tornelasmias include:
 Tornelasmias capricorni

References

 GBIF Checklist Bank, Beta version

 
Achatinellidae
Taxonomy articles created by Polbot